Nephromopsis is a genus of lichenized fungi within the Parmeliaceae family.

References

External links

 Index Fungorum

Parmeliaceae
Lichen genera
Lecanorales genera
Taxa named by Johannes Müller Argoviensis